Wales Rugby League is the national governing body for rugby league football in Wales.

In 1907 The Welsh Northern Rugby Football Union was formed in Wrexham, but the English Northern Rugby Football Union refused it affiliation as they wanted the body located in the south of Wales and the Welsh body soon folded.

In 1926 the English body, now called the Rugby Football League (RFL) formed a Welsh commission in an attempt to convert rugby union clubs to rugby league. The Wales Rugby League achieved governing body status in 2005 and employed its first professional chairman, Mark Rowley, in 2006. The WRL is responsible for the running of the game in Wales, for organising games and competitions and for selecting the squad for the national teams. In addition to managing professional and amateur national representative senior teams, WRL runs several age grade international sides from under 13s to a student team. The senior teams each play in annual European competitions, and the professional side compete in the World Cup every 4 years.

In 2006 the WRL achieved autonomous status from the Rugby Football League. In 2010, at a meeting of the Rugby League International Federation in Melbourne, Australia, the WRL were made full members of the Federation.

WRL has 14 affiliated clubs, including four university clubs. Wales Rugby League is based at Sports Wales Centre in Cardiff 

The national team took part in the 2011 Gillette Four Nations tournament against Australia, England and New Zealand.

The under 19s contingent, consisting of players from South Wales Scorpions and North Wales Crusaders, won the bronze medal at the inaugural Commonwealth Rugby League Championships, which took place in June 2014 in Glasgow.  The gold medal was won by Papua New Guinea, with Australia winning silver.

Former France and England head coach, John Kear, took over from Iestyn Harris as national head coach on 16 July 2014, a role he will undertake alongside his coaching role at Championship side Batley.  His first games in charge were during the European Championships in Autumn 2014.

Wales qualified for the 2017 World Cup in Australia, through beating Italy away in a playoff for the 2nd European spot. By finishing 2nd in the 2018 European Championship behind France and defeating Ireland 30–8 in Wrexham, they earned automatic qualification for the 2021 World Cup in England. Wales will also field a wheelchair side in the accompanying tournament. In 2019 they took part in the Rugby League World Cup 9s tournament in Australia.

See also 

 Rugby Football League
 British Amateur Rugby League Association
 Wales national rugby league team
 Rugby league in Wales
 Rugby League Championships
 Rugby League Conference
 North Wales League (rugby league)
 Rugby League Conference Welsh Premier

References

External links

Rugby League
Rugby league in Wales
Rugby league governing bodies in Europe
2005 establishments in Wales
Sports organizations established in 2005